National Training and Research Academy for Multilingual Shorthand (NTRAMS) is an autonomous government institute that provides human resource, lingual, and management courses in Fultola, Bogra, Bangladesh.

History
The academy was founded in 1982 by the government of Bangladesh as an autonomous institution under the Ministry of Education. It has provided 1600 students with computer-based training since 1989. It is headed by a government officer with the rank of a joint secretary. It provides training to both government and non-government officers.

References

Research institutes in Bangladesh
Government agencies of Bangladesh
1973 establishments in Bangladesh
Organisations based in Bogra District